Stay Sexy & Don’t Get Murdered: The Definitive How-to Guide is a nonfiction book written by Georgia Hardstark and Karen Kilgariff, host of the true crime comedy podcast My Favorite Murder. The book is a dual memoir of Hardstark and Kilgariff and also discusses true crime. It was released on May 28, 2019. There is an audiobook available with Georgia Hardstark and Karen Kilgariff as the narrators, also with the help of Paul Giamatti.

Synopsis
The book is a dual memoir of Kilgariff and Hardstark. Along with the title of the book, chapter titles in the book are also common catch phrases taken from the podcast, My Favorite Murder. The book also includes personal photos from Kilgariff and Hardstark's life such as family photos or photos from their youth. Critics have noted that though the book does touch on true crime, it is largely a mixture of memoir and self-help.

Structure 
Each chapter of Stay Sexy & Don't Get Murdered, is split between Hardstark and Kilgariff telling their own experiences.

 Intro: Let's Sit Crooked & Talk Straight

 F*ck Politeness
 Sweet Baby Angel
 You're in a Cult, Call Your Dad
 Send 'Em Back
 Don't be a Fucking Lunatic
 Get a Job
 Buy Your Own Shit
 Stay Out of the Forest

 Conclusion: Fuckin' Hooray!

True crime mentions 

 Polly Klaas
 Paul Bernardo and Karla Homolka 
 Roy Melanson
 Rodney Alcala
 Ted Bundy
 Jonestown

References

2019 non-fiction books
English-language books
Forge Books books